Lanfranco Dettori  (born 15 December 1970), better known as Frankie Dettori, is an Italian horse racing jockey based in the United Kingdom. Dettori has been British flat racing Champion Jockey three times and has ridden the winners of more than 500 Group races. This includes 20 winners of the English classics. His most celebrated achievement was riding all seven winners on British Festival of racing Day at Ascot Racecourse in 1996. He is the son of the Sardinian jockey Gianfranco Dettori, who was a prolific winner in Italy. He was described by the late Lester Piggott as the best jockey currently riding.

Since the end of 2012, Dettori has been operating as a freelance, having split with Godolphin Racing, for whom he was stable jockey and had most of his big race victories.
On 5 December 2012, he was suspended from riding for six months after being found guilty of taking a prohibited substance, believed to be cocaine.

Career
Born in Milan, Italy, Dettori's first experience with horses was at the age of twelve, and his father bought him a Palomino pony. This had some impact on him, as he rode the horse often. When he was 13 Dettori left school to become a stable boy and apprentice jockey. The following year, he went to Great Britain, where he apprenticed with trainer Luca Cumani at Newmarket in 1985, becoming a stable jockey soon after.

In 1990, Dettori became the first teenager since Lester Piggott to ride 100 winners in one season. His first win came at the age of 16 in Turin in November 1986, while his first victory in Britain was the following June. Further success followed, with numerous winners in Group 1 races. On 28 September 1996 he achieved the feat of winning all seven races on a single day at Ascot Racecourse. This achievement was subsequently commemorated in a painting by the noted equine artist Barrie Linklater, commisisoned by the Ascot Authority.

He was the subject of This Is Your Life in 1998, when he was surprised by Michael Aspel at the International Sportsman's Club in London.

In a 2010 interview with the BBC's Newsnight, he admitted that he used to take diuretic drugs to keep his weight down. Dettori said he had used a wide range of substances before the Jockey Club banned them in June 1998 after a spate of positive drug tests revealed how prevalent their use was becoming: "I took Lasix, pee pills, diuretics, laxatives; all sorts".

On 1 June 2000, Dettori was injured when the Piper Seneca on which he was traveling crashed near Newmarket. A police spokesman commented "It would certainly seem to be a miracle that anyone got out of the crash alive". On 29 December of the same year he received an honorary MBE.

Dettori was the retained jockey for the Godolphin racing stables, but it was announced in September 2012, that the retainer would not be renewed in 2013. He is well known for his distinctive "flying dismounts".

He quit his position as a team captain on the BBC quiz A Question of Sport in 2003, when he was apparently stung by a question from a participant as to when he retired from riding. Since that time he has completely rededicated himself to riding. He was rewarded for his newfound dedication by becoming the British Champion Jockey in 2004.

The Epsom Derby was the only British Classic Race Dettori had not won in his career, until his fifteenth attempt on 2 June 2007 on the Peter Chapple-Hyam trained Authorized. The following day he won the Prix du Jockey Club on Lawman, notching up a derby double.

In 2007, Dettori became the face of "Jockey" yoghurt, sold across Europe, but especially popular in France. The product initially courted controversy for its sweet flavour, but Dettori's advertising campaign – "Frankie know whatta you a-like!" – has seen sales rise slightly.

In November 2012, he faced an inquiry following a failed drugs test while riding in France in September, and on 5 December 2012, Dettori was suspended from riding for six months after being found guilty of taking a prohibited substance believed to be cocaine. In a statement, his lawyer said he "also accepts that he has let down the sport he loves and all those associated with it, as well as the wider public".

In January 2013, Dettori was the fifth to be evicted on the eleventh series of the British reality show, Celebrity Big Brother.

After serving his six-month ban, Dettori made his racing comeback at Epsom on the 31 May 2013. A week later, he won his first race riding Asian Trader at Sandown.

From June 2013 to July 2018, Dettori was the retained rider in Britain for Sheikh Joaan Al Thani's Al Shaqab Racing.

By the end of the 2017 season, he had ridden more than 3,000 winners in Great Britain, over 750 more than the next currently active jockey.

Personal life

Like many other jockeys and trainers, Dettori lives in Stetchworth near Newmarket, Suffolk. He is married to Catherine and they have five children: Leo, Ella, Mia, Tallula, and Rocco.

Although a republican, he is an ardent Anglophile; he likes English culture and is an Arsenal supporter. He has a line of frozen Italian food and in 2004 he opened a restaurant, Frankie's Italian Bar and Grill in Putney, London, with the chef Marco Pierre White. They subsequently opened a further three restaurants in London (in Knightsbridge, Chiswick and the Selfridges store) and one in Dubai (which opened in 2007).

In 2000, Dettori and Ray Cochrane were aboard a Piper Seneca plane which crashed on take off at Newmarket on its way to Goodwood in Sussex, killing pilot Patrick Mackey. Dettori escaped with a fractured right ankle and an injured thumb, and spent some weeks in Addenbrooke's Hospital.

Thieves stole many of Dettori's medals from his home on the evening of 25 August 2006. Items missing include three Gold Cups awarded in Japan and his MBE.

Major wins

 Great Britain
 1,000 Guineas – (4) – Cape Verdi (1998), Kazzia (2002), Blue Bunting (2011), Mother Earth (2021)
 2,000 Guineas – (3) – Mark of Esteem (1996), Island Sands (1999), Galileo Gold (2016)
 Ascot Gold Cup – (8) – Drum Taps (1992, 1993), Kayf Tara (1998), Papineau (2004), Colour Vision (2012), Stradivarius (2018, 2019, 2020)
 British Champions Sprint Stakes - (5) - Chummy's Favourite (1989), Diffident (1996), Sampower Star (2000), Acclamation (2003), Kinross (2022)
 British Champions Fillies' and Mares' Stakes – (3) – Journey (2016), Star Catcher (2019), Emily Upjohn (2022)
 Champion Stakes – (2) – Cracksman (2017, 2018)
 Cheveley Park Stakes – (2) – Regal Rose (2000), Carry On Katie (2003)
 Commonwealth Cup – (2) – Advertise (2019), Campanelle (2021)
 Coronation Cup – (5) – Swain (1996), Singspiel (1997), Daylami (1999), Mutafaweq (2001), Cracksman (2018)
 Coronation Stakes – (2) – Alpine Star (2020), Inspiral (2022)
 Dewhurst Stakes – (3) – Too Darn Hot (2018), St Mark's Basilica (2020), Chaldean (2022)
 Diamond Jubilee Stakes – (2) – So Factual (1995), Undrafted (2015)
 Derby – (2) – Authorized (2007), Golden Horn (2015)
 Eclipse Stakes – (3) – Daylami (1998), Refuse To Bend (2004), Golden Horn (2015), Enable (2019)
 Falmouth Stakes – (1) – Nahoodh (2008)
 Fillies' Mile – (7) – Shamshir (1990), Glorosia (1997), Teggiano (1999), Crystal Music (2000), White Moonstone (2010), Lyric of Light (2011), Inspiral (2021)
 Goodwood Cup – (5) – – Kayf Tara (1999), Schiaparelli (2009), Opinion Poll (2011), Stradivarius (2019, 2020)
 Haydock Sprint Cup – (1) – Diktat (1999)
 International Stakes – (5) – Halling (1996), Singspiel (1997), Sakhee (2001), Sulamani (2004), Authorized (2007)
 King George VI and Queen Elizabeth Stakes – (7) – Lammtarra (1995), Swain (1998), Daylami (1999), Doyen (2004), Enable (2017, 2019, 2020)
 King's Stand Stakes – (1) – Lochsong (1994)
 Lockinge Stakes – (5) – Emperor Jones (1994), Aljabr (2000), Creachadoir (2008), Olympic Glory (2014), Palace Pier (2021)
 Middle Park Stakes – (4) – Bahamian Bounty (1996), Lujain (1998), Dutch Art (2006), Shalaa (2015)
 Nassau Stakes – (2) – Lailani (2001), Ouija Board (2006)
 Nunthorpe Stakes – (3) – Lochsong (1993), So Factual (1995), Lochangel (1998)
 Oaks – (6) – Balanchine (1994), Moonshell (1995), Kazzia (2002), Enable (2017), Anapurna (2019), Snowfall (2021)
 Prince of Wales's Stakes – (4) – Fantastic Light (2001), Grandera (2002), Rewilding (2011), Crystal Ocean (2019)
 Queen Anne Stakes – (7) – Markofdistinction (1990), Allied Forces (1997), Intikhab (1998), Dubai Destination (2003), Refuse to Bend (2004), Ramonti (2007), Palace Pier (2021)
 Queen Elizabeth II Stakes – (6) – Markofdistinction (1990), Mark of Esteem (1996), Dubai Millennium (1999), Ramonti (2007), Poet's Voice (2010), Persuasive (2017)
 Racing Post Trophy – (2) – Authorized (2006), Casamento (2010)
 St. James's Palace Stakes – (3) – Starborough (1997), Galileo Gold (2016), Without Parole (2018), Palace Pier (2020)
 St. Leger – (6) – Classic Cliche (1995), Shantou (1996), Scorpion (2005), Sixties Icon (2006), Conduit (2008), Logician (2019)
 Sun Chariot Stakes – (1) – Red Slippers (1992)
 Sussex Stakes – (5) – Second Set (1991), Aljabr (1999), Noverre (2001), Ramonti (2007), Too Darn Hot (2019)
 Yorkshire Oaks – (4) – Only Royale (1994), Blue Bunting (2011), Enable (2017), Enable (2019)

Frankie Dettori has won every Group 1 race in the UK, except for the July Cup.

 Bahrain
The Crown Prince Cup – (4) – Bartack (2015), (2016), Shogun (2018), Thorkhill Star (2019)
Crown Prince Cup for locally bred horses – (1) – Knight and Day (2016)
King's Cup – (3) – Field Of Fame (2016), Shogun (2018), Rustang (2019)
Al Khalifa Cup – (1) – Shogun (2018)
Bahrain Gold Cup – (2) – Thorkhill Star (2018), (2019)
Al Methaq Mile – (1) – Thorkhill Star (2019)

 France
 Critérium International – (1) – Angel Bleu (2021)
 Critérium de Saint-Cloud – (1) – Passion for Gold (2009)
 Grand Prix de Saint-Cloud – (2) – Alkaased (2005), Coronet (2019)
 Poule d'Essai des Poulains – (3) – Vettori (1995), Bachir (2000), Shamardal (2005)
 Prix de l'Abbaye de Longchamp – (3) – Lochsong (1993, 1994), Var (2004)
 Prix de l'Arc de Triomphe – (6) – Lammtarra (1995), Sakhee (2001), Marienbard (2002), Golden Horn (2015), Enable (2017, 2018)
 Prix du Cadran – (1) – Sergeant Cecil (2006)
 Prix de Diane – (2) – West Wind (2007), Star Of Seville (2015)
 Prix de la Forêt – (3) – Caradak (2006), Olympic Glory (2014), Kinross (2022)
 Prix Ganay – (2) – Pelder (1995), Cracksman (2018)
 Prix d'Ispahan – (2) – Halling (1996), Best of the Bests (2002)
 Prix Jacques Le Marois – (7) – Dubai Millennium (1999), Muhtathir (2000), Librettist (2006), Al Wukair (2017), Palace Pier (2020, 2021), Inspiral (2022)
 Prix Jean-Luc Lagardère – (3) – Rio de la Plata (2007), Dabirsim (2011), Angel Bleu (2021)
 Prix Jean Prat – (4) – Torrential (1995), Starborough (1997), Almutawakel (1998), Too Darn Hot (2019)
 Prix Jean Romanet – (3) – Folk Opera (2008), Ribbons (2014), Coronet (2019)
 Prix du Jockey Club – (3) – Polytain (1992), Shamardal (2005), Lawman (2007)
 Prix Lupin – (1) – Flemensfirth (1995)
 Prix Marcel Boussac – (2) – Ryafan (1996), Sulk (2001)
 Prix Maurice de Gheest – (2) – Diktat (1999), Advertise (2019)
 Prix Morny – (6) – Bahamian Bounty (1996), Dabirsim (2011), The Wow Signal (2014), Shalaa (2015), Lady Aurelia (2016), Campanelle (2020)
 Prix du Moulin de Longchamp – (2) – Slickly (2001), Librettist (2006)
 Prix de l'Opéra – (1) – Nahrain (2011)
 Prix de la Salamandre – (2) – Lord of Men (1995), Aljabr (1998)
 Prix de Royallieu – (6) – Annaba (1996), Tulipa (1997), Moon Queen (2001), Anna Pavlova (2007), Anapurna (2019), Loving Dream (2021)
 Prix Vermeille – (3) – Mezzo Soprano (2003), Trêve (2013), Star Catcher (2019)
 Critérium International – (1) – Alson (2019)

 Qatar 
Emir's Trophy – (2) – Dubday (2014), Dubday (2015)
HH Sheik Mohammed Bin Khalifa Al Thani Trophy – (1) – Dubday (2014)
Qatar Gold Trophy – (1) – Dubday (2015)

 United Arab Emirates 
Jebel Ali Mile – (1) 

 Germany
 Bayerisches Zuchtrennen – (3) – Germany (1995), Kutub (2001), Elliptique (2016)
 Deutsches Derby – (1) – Temporal (1991)
 Deutschland-Preis – (3) – Luso (1997), Marienbard (2002), Campanologist (2010)
 Grosser Preis von Baden – (3) – Germany (1995), Marienbard (2002), Mamool (2003)
 Preis der Diana – (1) – Miss Yoda (2020)
 Preis von Europa – (3) – Kutub (2001), Mamool (2003), Campanologist (2011)

 Macau
Macau Derby – (1) – Royal Treasure (2002)

 Hong Kong
 Centenary Sprint Cup – (1) – Firebolt (2002)
 Hong Kong Cup – (3) – Fantastic Light (2000), Falbrav (2003), Ramonti (2007)
 Hong Kong Mile – (1) – Firebreak (2004)
 Hong Kong Vase – (2) – Luso (1996), Mastery (2010)
 Queen Elizabeth II Cup – (1) – Overbury (1996)

 Trinidad and Tobago
Caribbean Champion Stakes – (1) – Bigman in Town (2014)

 Slovakia
Slovenské Derby – (1) – Muskatsturm (2002)
Bratislavska Mile – (1) – Tribal Instinct (2002)

 South Africa
Cape Derby – (1) – Edict of Nantes (2017)

 Ireland
 Irish 2,000 Guineas – (2) – Bachir (2000), Dubawi (2005)
 Irish Champion Stakes – (6) – Swain (1998), Daylami (1999), Fantastic Light (2001), Grandera (2002), Snow Fairy (2012), Golden Horn (2015)
 Irish Derby – (1) – Balanchine (1994)
 Irish Oaks – (5) – Lailani (2001), Vintage Tipple (2003), Blue Bunting (2011), Enable (2017), Star Catcher (2019)
 Irish St. Leger – (2) – Kayf Tara (1999), Wicklow Brave (2016)
 Matron Stakes – (1) – Independence (2001)
 National Stakes – (1) – Dubawi (2004)
 Phoenix Stakes – (2) – Pips Pride (1992), Advertise (2018)
 Pretty Polly Stakes – (1) – Del Deya (1994)
 Tattersalls Gold Cup – (2) – Daylami (1998), Fantastic Light (2001)

 Sweden
 Bro Park Sprint Championship – (1) – Jayannpee (1996)

 Italy
 Derby Italiano – (3) – Mukhalif (1999), Mastery (2009), King's Caper (2020)
 Gran Criterium – (1) – Kirklees (2006)
 Gran Premio del Jockey Club – (6) – Misil (1993), Shantou (1996), Kutub (2001), Cherry Mix (2005), Schiaparelli (2009), Campanologist (2011)
 Gran Premio d'Italia – (1) – Masad (1992)
 Gran Premio di Milano – (3) – Shantou (1997), Sudan (2007), Dylan Mouth (2016)
 Oaks d'Italia – (1) – Nicole Pharly (1997)
 Premio Roma – (5) – Legal Case (1990), Misil (1992), Flemensfirth (1996), Sunstrach (2002), Rio De La Plata (2010)
 Premio Vittorio di Capua – (5) – Muhtathir (1999), Slickly (2001, 2002), Ancient World (2004), Rio De La Plata (2010)

 Switzerland
GP Hotel Soldanella (White Turf) – (1) – Sweet Venture (2010)

 Canada
 Canadian International Stakes – (4) – Mutafaweq (2000), Sulamani (2004), Joshua Tree (2012), Walton Street (2021)
 E. P. Taylor Stakes – (2) – Timarida (1995), Folk Opera (2008)
 Natalma Stakes - (1) - Wild Beauty (2021)
 Summer Stakes - (1) - Albahr (2021)

 Australia
 A J Moir Stakes – (1) – Spinning Hill (2002)

 United Arab Emirates
Al Maktoum Challenge, Round 3 – (5) – Dubai Millennium (2000), Street Cry (2002), Grandera (2003), Electrocutionist (2006), Jalil (2008)
 Dubai Turf – (3) – Tamayaz (1997), Lord North (2021, 2022)
 Dubai Golden Shaheen – (1) – Kelly's Landing (2007)
 Dubai Sheema Classic – (3) – Stowaway (1998), Sulamani (2003), Rewilding (2011)
 Dubai World Cup – (4) – Dubai Millennium (2000), Moon Ballad (2003), Electrocutionist (2006), Country Grammer (2022)
 Jebel Hatta – (2) – Siege (2000), Mahfooth (2001)
 Al Quoz Sprint – (1) – Great Britain (2007)

 Turkey
Anatolia Trophy – (2) – Balius (2009), Hunter's light (2012)

 United States
 Beverly D. Stakes – (1) – Crimson Palace (2004)
 Breeders' Cup Classic – (1) – Raven's Pass (2008)
 Breeders' Cup Filly & Mare Turf – (2) – Ouija Board (2006), Queen's Trust (2016)
 Breeders' Cup Juvenile – (1) – Wilko (2004)
 Breeders' Cup Juvenile Turf – (3) – Donativum (2008), Pounced (2009), Hootenanny (2014)
 Breeders' Cup Mile – (2) – Barathea (1994), Expert Eye (2018)
 Breeders' Cup Turf – (5) – Daylami (1999), Fantastic Light (2001), Red Rocks (2006), Dangerous Midge (2010), Enable (2018)

 Mauritius
The Air Mauritius Pailles
Le Grand Prix De France
The Long Beach Cup

 Japan
 Japan Cup – (3) – Singspiel (1996), Falbrav (2002), Alkaased (2005)
 Japan Cup Dirt – (1) – Eagle Cafe (2002)

 Singapore
 Singapore Gold Cup – (1) – Kutub (2002)
 Singapore Airlines International Cup – (1) – Grandera (2002)
Singapore Plate – (1) – Timahs (2000)

 Saudi Arabia 
Custodian of the Holy Two Mosques – (1) – Sir Jade (2014)
King Abdulaziz Cup  – (2) – Nashaatt (2006), Estehqaaq (2012)
The Stc 1351 Cup (Sprint) – (1) – Dark Power (2020)

Year-end charts in the United States

See also
List of jockeys

References

External links
Jockey's Room – has biography and career win statistics
 – Video replays, official charts, and article recaps of every Breeders' Cup race.
Racing Post Stats
Frankies italian Bar and Grill – Frankie's Restaurants and Bars
 – BBC Question of Sport Website
Sunday Times article 19 July, 2009
 Arsenal.com – Famous Fans: Champion jockey Frankie Dettori

1970 births
Living people
Sportspeople from Milan
People from Newmarket, Suffolk
Italian jockeys
Lester Award winners
Members of the Order of the British Empire
Survivors of aviation accidents or incidents
Italian British sportspeople
Italian emigrants to the United Kingdom
People of Sardinian descent
People of Lombard descent
British Champion flat jockeys
British Champion apprentice jockeys
British republicans